LWRC International, LLC, formerly known as Land Warfare Resources Corporation, is a CAGE defense contractor and firearms manufacturer, founded in 1999, and is now based in Cambridge, Maryland.

History
The company began in 1999, and was originally located in northern Virginia. The company was focused on R&D. In 2006, the company purchased Grenadier Precision Limited.

In 2006, retired U.S. Army veteran Pat Bryan, along with a management team, purchased the company and began to manufacture firearms. The company focused on producing a proprietary short-stroke gas piston system on the M4 platform.

In 2008, Richard Bernstein and a group of investors purchased LWRC International. Bernstein was president and CEO after the purchase. The company has been focused on improving upon the direct impingement M4 carbine assault rifle. They provide weapons to The Pentagon, the Jordanian Armed Forces, and Georgia SWAT. Darren Mellors and Jesse Gomez, employees of the previous LWRC and Grenadier, were tasked with marketing and development. The former LWRC CEO Pat Bryan was retained to focus on international marketing.

The company produces several M6 series weapons based on the M4 carbine, which use a proprietary short-stroke self-regulating gas piston system and bolt carrier design. This system prevents trapped gases from contacting the bolt carrier or receiver of the weapon, which reduces the heating and carbon fouling of the internals, simplifies field maintenance, and improves reliability.

Three segments of the Discovery Channel show Future Weapons were filmed featuring LWRC's weapons. Weapons featured were the M6A2, M6A4, and the Sniper/Assaulter Battle Rifle (LWRC SABR).

References

Firearm manufacturers of the United States
Manufacturing companies based in Maryland
Manufacturing companies established in 1999
1999 establishments in Maryland